Dorstenia lindeniana is a plant species in the family Moraceae which is native to Mexico, Guatemala and Belize.

References

lindeniana
Plants described in 1873
Flora of Belize
Flora of Guatemala
Flora of Mexico